La quintrala is a 1955 Argentine drama film directed by Hugo del Carril. It won the Silver Condor Award for Best Film.

Cast
Antonio Vilar ...  Fray Pedro de Figueroa, The Saint
Ana María Lynch...  Catalina de los Ríos y Lisperguer, La Quintrala
Francisco de Paula ...  Enrique de Guzmán
Milagros de la Vega
Manuel Perales ...  The Catalina's Father
Andrés Mejuto ...  The Catalina's Uncle
José Comellas ...  The Governator
Francisco López Silva ...  The Bishop
Iván Grondona ...  The Catalina's lover
Antonio Martiáñez ...  The Confessor
María Esther Álvarez
Ricardo Mendoza
Domingo Garibotto
Félix Tortorelli
Enrique San Migue

External links 

 

1955 films
Argentine drama films
1950s Spanish-language films
1955 drama films
Films directed by Hugo del Carril
Argentine black-and-white films
1950s Argentine films